Jerry Doyle (1956–2016) was an American radio host, conservative political commentator, and television actor.

Jerry or Gerry Doyle may also refer to:
 Jerry Doyle (politician) (born 1941), Canadian politician, Alberta NDP MLA Yellowhead
 Gerry Doyle (hurler), Irish hurler
 Gerry Doyle (Irish footballer) (1911–1990), Irish footballer and football manager
 Gerry Doyle (Scottish footballer) (born 1965), Scottish footballer

See also
Jeremy Doyle (1983–2011), Australian wheelchair basketball player
Jeremiah Doyle (1849–1909), Irish-born Catholic bishop